Major-General Ian Hallam Lyall Grant MC (4 June 1915 – 29 February 2020) was a British army officer, engineer and government official. He wrote two books based on his experience in the Burma campaign during World War II.

Career
Lyall Grant was commissioned in the Royal Engineers on 31 January 1935,

Later life and death
Major-General Ian Hallam Lyall Grant died at age 104 in a care home in Chichester.

Books
Burma: The Turning Point
Burma 1942: the Japanese invasion; both sides tell the story of a savage jungle war

References

External links

1915 births
2020 deaths
British Army major generals
20th-century British engineers
British centenarians
Men centenarians
Recipients of the Military Cross
Royal Engineers officers